Francis Edward Rawdon-Hastings, 1st Marquess of Hastings,  (9 December 175428 November 1826), styled The Honourable Francis Rawdon from birth until 1762, Lord Rawdon between 1762 and 1783, The Lord Rawdon from 1783 to 1793 and The Earl of Moira between 1793 and 1816, was an Anglo-Irish politician and military officer who served as Governor-General of India from 1813 to 1823. He had also served with British forces for years during the American Revolutionary War and in 1794 during the War of the First Coalition. He took the additional surname "Hastings" in 1790 in compliance with the will of his maternal uncle, Francis Hastings, 10th Earl of Huntingdon.

Background, education and early military career
Hastings was born at Moira, County Down, the son of John Rawdon, 1st Earl of Moira and Elizabeth Hastings, 13th Baroness Hastings, who was a daughter of the 9th Earl of Huntingdon. He was baptised at St. Audoen's Church, Dublin, on 2 January 1755. He grew up in Moira and in Dublin. He joined the British Army on 7 August 1771 as an ensign in the 15th Foot (the going rate for purchasing a commission for this rank was £200). From that time on his life was spent entirely in the service of his country. He was at Harrow School and matriculated at University College, Oxford, but dropped out. He became friends there with Banastre Tarleton. With his uncle Lord Huntingdon, he went on the Grand Tour. On 20 October 1773, he was promoted to lieutenant in the 5th Foot. He returned to England to join his regiment, and sailed for America on 7 May 1774.

American War of Independence

Battle of Bunker Hill

Rawdon was posted at Boston as a lieutenant in the 5th Regiment of Foot's Grenadier company, which was then under the command of Captain Francis Marsden. He first saw action at the Battles of Lexington and Concord and the Battle of Bunker Hill. Serving with the grenadiers, he participated in the second assault against Breed's Hill (which failed), and the third assault against the redoubt. His superior, Captain Harris, was wounded beside him. At the age of 21, Lord Rawdon took command of the company for the third and final assault. When the troops of the third assault began to falter, Rawdon stood atop of the American redoubt, waving the British ensign. John Burgoyne noted in dispatches: "Lord Rawdon has this day stamped his fame for life." He also was wounded during the assault. He was promoted captain, and given a company in the 63rd Foot.

After having recognized him upon entering the redoubt, it is stated by The 1st Earl of Russell in his Essays, and Sketches of Life and Character that it was Lieutenant Rawdon that executed the already mortally wounded American general Joseph Warren by shooting him through the head. Lord Rawdon is depicted in John Trumbull's famous painting, The Death of General Warren at the Battle of Bunker Hill. Rawdon is in the far background holding the British ensign.

Campaigns in the Carolinas and New York, 1775–76

He was appointed Aide-de-camp to General Sir Henry Clinton, and sailed with him on the expedition to Brunswick Town, North Carolina, on the Cape Fear River, and then to the repulse at Fort Moultrie, Charleston, South Carolina. He returned with him to New York. On 4 August, he dined with General Clinton, Admiral Lord Howe, Lord Cornwallis, General Vaughan, and others. During the Battle of Long Island, he was at headquarters with Clinton.

On 15 September, Rawdon led his men at Kip's Bay, an amphibious landing on Manhattan island. The next day, he led his troops in support of the Light Infantry that attacked Harlem Heights until the Americans withdrew. He participated at the landings at Pell's Point.  The British pressed the Americans to White Plains, where on 1 November the Americans withdrew from their entrenchments.

Rhode Island, England, and New York
On 8 December Rawdon landed with Clinton at Rhode Island, securing the ports for the British Navy. On 13 January 1777, with Clinton, he departed for London, arriving on 1 March. During a ball at Lord George Germain's, he met Lafayette, who was visiting London.

Returning to America in July, while Howe went to his Philadelphia campaign, Rawdon went with Clinton to the New York headquarters. He participated in the battles of the New York Highlands, where on 7 October, Fort Constitution (opposite West Point) was captured. However, this was too late to link up with General Burgoyne at Albany.

Rawdon was sent to Philadelphia with dispatches and returned to New York for the winter, where he raised a regiment, called the Volunteers of Ireland, recruited from deserters and Irish Loyalists. Promoted colonel in command of this regiment, Rawdon went with Clinton to Philadelphia. starting out on 18 June 1778, he went with Clinton during the withdrawal from Philadelphia to New York, and saw action at the Battle of Monmouth. He was appointed adjutant general. Rawdon was sent to learn news of the Battle of Rhode Island.

In New York, on 3 September 1779, he quarrelled with Clinton, and resigned his position as adjutant general. He served with the Volunteers of Ireland during the raid on Staten Island by Lord Stirling on 15 January 1780.

Southern Campaign

He went south to the Siege of Charleston with reinforcements. After the city fell to the British, Lord Cornwallis posted him at Camden (16 August 1780) as the British sought to occupy South Carolina. Rawdon commanded the British left wing at the Battle of Camden. When Cornwallis went into Virginia, he left Rawdon in effective command in the South.

Perhaps his most noted achievement was the victory in 1781 at the Battle of Hobkirk's Hill, in which, in command of only a small force, he defeated by superior military skill and determination, a much larger body of Americans. Thinking (in error) that General Nathanael Greene had moved his artillery away, Rawdon attacked Greene's left wing. Rawdon quickly concentrated his entire force on the American left flank, using the military advantage of local superiority, which forced the American line to collapse and abandon the field in disorder.

However, Rawdon was forced to begin a gradual retreat to Charleston. He relieved the Siege of Ninety-Six, evacuating its small garrison and conducting a limited pursuit of American troops. He withdrew his forces to Charleston. In July 1781, in poor health, he gave up his command. On his return to Great Britain, he was captured at sea by François Joseph Paul de Grasse, but was exchanged. After Rawdon's departure, the British evacuated Charleston as the war drew to a close. They took thousands of Loyalists and freed slaves with them, having promised freedom to slaves of rebels who joined their lines, resettling these groups in Nova Scotia and the Caribbean.

Peace years
On his arrival in England, Rawdon was honoured by King George III, who created him an English peer (Baron Rawdon) in March 1783. In 1789 his mother succeeded to the barony of Hastings, and Rawdon added the surname of Hastings to his own.

Rawdon became active in associations in London. He was elected a Fellow of the Royal Society in 1787 and Fellow of the Society of Antiquaries of London in 1793. For 1806–08 he was Grand Master of the Free Masons.

In May 1789 he acted as the Duke of York's second in his duel with Lieut.-Colonel Lennox on Wimbledon Common.

French Revolutionary Wars

Following the declaration of war in 1793 of France upon Great Britain, Rawdon was appointed major general, on 12 October 1793. Sent by the Pitt ministry, Rawdon launched an expedition into Ostend, France, in 1794. He marched to join with the army of the Duke of York, at Alost. The French general Pichegru, with superior numbers, forced the British back toward their base at Antwerp. Rawdon left the expedition, feeling Pitt had broken promises.

Donington Hall

Inheriting Donington Hall in Leicestershire from his uncle, Rawdon rebuilt it in 1790–93 in the Gothic style; the architect was William Wilkins the Elder. It is now a Grade II* listed building.

He placed the estate at the disposal of the Bourbon Princes upon their exile in England following the French Revolution. He is said to have left a signed chequebook in each bedroom for the occupant to use at pleasure.

Irish parliamentarian and patron
Rawdon sat for Randalstown in the Irish House of Commons from 1781 until 1783. That year he was created Baron Rawdon, of Rawdon, in the County of York. In 1787, he became friends with the Prince of Wales, and loaned him many thousands of pounds. In 1788 he became embroiled in the Regency Crisis.

In 1789, he took the surname Hastings in accordance with his uncle's will. He succeeded his father as 2nd Earl of Moira on 20 June 1793, and thereafter served first in the Irish House of Lords and then, from 1801, in the United Kingdom House of Lords.

In the Irish Parliament, Rawdon associated on most questions with the Patriot party of Henry Grattan and Lord Charlemont. In an eve-of-the -Rebellion speech to the Lords on 19 February 1798 he appealed for parliamentary reform (through their "pocket boroughs" the Lords effectively nominated two-thirds of the Irish Commons), the emancipation of Catholics (extended the limited right to vote in 1793 but excluded from parliament) and denounced the government's policy of coercion. He presented evidence collated and supplied by the eminent physician Whitley Stokes of the atrocities and tortures visited upon country people by Crown forces as they sought to break-up and disarm the Society of United Irishmen who, despairing of reform, had begun organising for insurrection.

Rawdon strenuously opposed the government as it moved, in the wake of the United Irish risings in the summer of 1798, to abolish the Irish Parliament and effect a legislative union with Great Britain. While Governor General of India, in 1814 Rawdon was to offer further evidence an Irish attachment. He headed the list of subscribers in Bengal to the Irish Harp Society formed in Belfast "to revive the Ancient Music of Ireland" by veterans of the patriotic and reform politics of the 1780s and '90s, among them several former United Irishmen. Prior to leaving for India, Rawdon had also used his offices to secure a position—registrar of the Admiralty Prize Court in Bermuda—for the Irish patriotic bard (and squib writer for the Whigs) Thomas Moore.

British Peer

Plot to become Prime Minister
In 1797 it was rumoured briefly that Rawdon (Moira) would replace Pitt as Prime Minister. There was some discontent with Pitt over his policies regarding the war with France. Additionally, Pitt's long tenure in office had given him ample opportunity to annoy various political grandees, including but not limited to The Duke of Leeds and Lords Thurlow and Lansdowne.

In mid-May, a combination of these various figures, coupled with a handful of Members of Parliament, proposed to make Rawdon (Moira) the Prime Minister. Having fought in the American War and having led an expedition to Quiberon, he commanded widespread respect. His relationship with the Prince of Wales also established him as a potential rival to Pitt, who was supported strongly by George III.

The prime motivation for the plan of having Rawdon (Moira) become Prime Minister was to secure peace with France, the plotters had come to believe (somewhat unfairly) that Pitt was an obstacle to this objective. But their plan collapsed barely a month later in mid-June because of a lack of support from the political establishment. Additionally, when Rawdon (Moira) wrote to the King to propose the change of chief ministers, the monarch ignored him. Thus the proposal came to nothing.

He became Commander-in-Chief, Scotland with the rank of full general in September 1803. In this capacity he rented the huge Duddingston House, south of Edinburgh.

Later politics
Rawdon was a long-standing advocate of Irish issues, in particular Catholic Emancipation. At one point he was described by the Irish revolutionary Wolfe Tone as "The Irish Lafayette".

Becoming a Whig in politics, he entered government in 1806 as part of the Ministry of All the Talents as Master-General of the Ordnance, which enabled him to carry a philanthropic measure, which he had promoted since his first entry into the House of Lords, the Debtor and Creditor Bill for relief of poor debtors. However, he resigned his post on the fall of the ministry the next year. He was also Constable of the Tower (of London) from 1806 to his death. Being a close associate of the Prince-Regent, Moira was asked by him to form a Whig government after the assassination of Spencer Perceval in 1812 ended that ministry. Both of Moira's attempts to create a governing coalition failed, but as a mark of the prince's respect, he was appointed to the Order of the Garter in that year. The Tories returned to power under the Earl of Liverpool. On 6 December 1816, after the conclusion of the Anglo-Nepalese War (see below), Moira was raised to the rank of Marquess of Hastings together with the subsidiary titles Viscount Loudoun and Earl of Rawdon.

Governor-General of India

Through the influence of the Prince-Regent, Moira was appointed Governor-General of the Presidency of Fort William, effectively the Governor-General of India, on 11 November 1812. His tenure as Governor-General was a memorable one, overseeing the victory in the Gurkha War (1814–1816); the final conquest of the Marathas in 1818; and the purchase of the island of Singapore in 1819.

After delays clearing his affairs, he reached Madras on 11 September 1813. In October, he settled in at Calcutta and assumed office.  British India then consisted of Madras, Bengal, and Bombay. He commanded an army of 15,000 British regulars, a Bengal army of 27 regiments of native infantry, and eight regiments of cavalry; a Madras army, led by General John Abercrombie of 24 regiments of native infantry, and eight regiments of native cavalry.

Anglo-Nepalese War

In May 1813, the British declared war against the Gurkhas of Nepal. Hastings sent four divisions in separate attacks led by General Bennet Marley with 8,000 men against Kathmandu, General John Sullivan Wood with 4,000 men against Butwal, General Sir David Ochterlony with 10,000 men against Amar Singh Thapa, and General Robert Rollo Gillespie, with 3,500 men against Nahan, Srinagar, and Garhwal. Only Ochterlony had some success; Gillespie was killed. After inconclusive negotiations, Hastings reinforced Ochterlony to 20,000 men, who then won the battle of Makwanpur on 28 February. The Gurkhas then sued for peace, under the Sugauli Treaty.

Third Anglo-Maratha War

After raids by Pindaris in January 1817, Hastings led a force at Hindustan in the North; in the South, the Army of the Deccan, under the command of General Sir Thomas Hislop.  The Peshwa was defeated by William Fullarton Elphinstone on the Poona. Appa Sahib was defeated at the battle of Nagpur. Hislop defeated Holkar at the Battle of Mahidpur. These events effectively established the supremacy of British power in India.

Diplomacy
Rawdon was active diplomatically, protecting weaker Indian states. His domestic policy in India was also largely successful, seeing the repair of the Mughul canal system in Delhi in 1820, as well as educational and administrative reforms, and encouraging press freedom. He confirmed the purchase of Singapore from the Sultan of Jahore, by Sir Stamford Raffles, in January 1819.

His last years of office were embittered by a then-notorious matter, the affairs of the W. Palmer and Company banking house. The whole affair was mixed up with insinuations against Lord Hastings, especially charging him with having shown favouritism towards one of the partners in the firm. He was later exonerated but the experience embittered him.

He also became increasingly estranged from the East India Company's Board of Control (see Company rule in India). He resigned in 1821 but did not leave India until early 1823. He was appointed Governor of Malta in 1824 but died at sea off Naples two years later aboard HMS Revenge, while attempting to return home with his wife. She returned his body to Malta, and following his earlier directions, cut off his right hand and preserved it, to be buried with her when she died. His body was then laid to rest in a large marble sarcophagus in Hastings Gardens, Valletta. His hand was eventually interred, clasped with hers, in the family vault at Loudoun Kirk.

Legacy
 He was awarded the freedom of the city of Dublin in recognition of his service in America.
 Loyalists whom he rescued from the Siege of Ninety-Six during the American Revolution were resettled by the Crown and granted land in Nova Scotia. They named their township Rawdon in his honour.
 Hastings County, Ontario, and three of its early townships were named after him, by Loyalists who were resettled in Upper Canada after the American Revolution.
 HMS Moira was named in his honour in 1805, as was the Moira River in Ontario, Canada.
 Francis Rawdon Moira Crozier (1796–c.1848), an Irish Royal Navy officer and polar explorer, was named for him; Lord Moira (as he was at the time) was a friend of Crozier's family.
 The Hastings River in New South Wales is named after him, as is Rawdon Island, within the River. The township of Huntingdon in the Hastings Valley is also associated with him.

Family

On 12 July 1804, at the age of 50, he married Flora Campbell, 6th Countess of Loudoun, daughter of Major-General James Mure-Campbell, 5th Earl of Loudoun and Lady Flora Macleod.  They had six children:

Flora Elizabeth Rawdon-Hastings (11 February 1806 – 5 July 1839), lady in waiting to Queen Victoria's mother, the Duchess of Kent, died unmarried.
Hon. Francis George Augustus (1807–1807), died in infancy.
George Augustus Francis Rawdon-Hastings, 2nd Marquess of Hastings (4 February 1808 – 13 January 1844)
Sophia Frederica Christina Rawdon-Hastings (1 February 1809 – 28 December 1859), married John Crichton-Stuart, 2nd Marquess of Bute, mother of John Crichton-Stuart, 3rd Marquess of Bute.
Selina Constance Rawdon-Hastings (1810 – 8 November 1867), married Charles Henry and had children.
Adelaide Augusta Lavinia Rawdon-Hastings (25 February 1812 – 6 December 1860), married Sir William Murray, 7th Baronet of Octertyre.
Through his brother, the Hon. John Theophilus Rawdon, he was uncle to Elizabeth, Lady William Russell.

In popular culture
The character of Rawdon Crawley in William Makepeace Thackeray's 1847–1848 novel Vanity Fair is named after him.
 He appears as Francis Rawdon Hastings, the Second Earl of Moira, in Stephanie Barron's 2006 novel Jane and the Barque of Frailty.

Portraits

References

Sources

External links

Ninety Six National Historic Site
Francis, Lord Rawdon – Colonel
Battle of Hobkirk's Hill
Rediscovering Hobkirk's Hill

|-

|-

1754 births
1826 deaths
People educated at Harrow School
Alumni of University College, Oxford
British Army personnel of the American Revolutionary War
British Commanders-in-Chief of India
Governors and Governors-General of Malta
Governors-General of India
Irish MPs 1776–1783
Knights Grand Cross of the Order of the Bath
Knights of the Garter
Lord-Lieutenants of the Tower Hamlets
Constables of the Tower of London
Members of the Parliament of Ireland (pre-1801) for County Antrim constituencies
People from County Down
People of the Anglo-Nepalese War
British military personnel of the Third Anglo-Maratha War
Presidents of The Asiatic Society
Rawdon-hastings, Francis
1
Freemasons of the Premier Grand Lodge of England
Peers of Great Britain created by George III
Barons Hastings
Barons Botreaux
Barons Hungerford
British Army personnel of the French Revolutionary Wars